Dendrotionidae is a family of isopods belonging to the order Isopoda.

Genera:
 Acanthomunna Beddard, 1886
 Dendromunna Menzies, 1962
 Dendrotion Sars, 1872
 Pleurotion Sars, 1897

References

Isopoda